Railroad Pass can refer to:

Railway passes
 A rail pass that can be used to travel on a railway, usually for a specific period of time rather than specific place. These include:
 The Eurail Pass / The Interrail Pass (Europe)
 The Japan Rail Pass (Japan)
 The Korea Rail Pass (South Korea)
 The Indrail Pass (India)
 The TR Pass (Taiwan)
 Various concessionary fares on the British railway network
 The BritRail Pass, available only to those who do not reside in the United Kingdom (see Rail transport in Great Britain)
 Other season tickets

Mountain passes
Railroad Pass (Mohave County, Arizona), a mountain pass in the United States northwest of Willcox, Arizona
Railroad Pass (Cochise County, Arizona), a mountain pass in the United States at Kingman, Arizona
Railroad Pass (Nevada), a mountain pass in the city of Henderson, Nevada, United States
Railroad Pass (British Columbia), a mountain pass in Canada's province of British Columbia

Casino
Railroad Pass Casino, Nevada (opened in 1931, oldest operating casino in Nevada)